The Appeal to Reason Tour was a concert tour by  American punk band Rise Against, taking place between 2008 and 2010, in support of their fifth studio album Appeal to Reason (2008).

The tour began with a series of summer pre-release shows, including European festival appearances and a few North American Vans Warped Tour dates. Those shows were performed as the band finished the recording of the album. The main supporting tour began in early October with the release of the album.

In the first official leg in the promotion of the Appeal to Reason album, the band was supported by Alkaline Trio, Thrice and The Gaslight Anthem through all the US (with some Canadian dates), this was followed by a series of Canadian dates in December, supported by Thursday and Sage Francis. The band then embarked on an Australian leg in the beginning of 2009, followed by a European leg, which was supported by Strike Anywhere and Rentokill, with all UK dates supported by Anti-Flag and Flobots (except the two last ones, where The King Blues replaced Anti-Flag). The band then returned to Australia, supported by The (International) Noise Conspiracy, and then embarked on a short Japanese tour, with a full-length North American summer tour. The first of it was supported by Rancid and Riverboat Gamblers, with the second part supported by Billy Talent and Rancid. The band then returned for another European leg, playing mainly festivals in the summer, with a winter headlining leg, supported by Thursday and Poison the Well.

Set list

Tour dates

Support acts

 A Death in the Family (March 25–27, 2009; January 19, 2010; January 24, 2010)
 50 Lions (March 28, 2009)
 After Midnight Project (December 4, 2009)
 Alkaline Trio (October 2–November 30, 2008)
 All That Remains (July 30, 2009)
 AM Taxi (December 17, 2009)
 Antillectual (June 20, 2008)
 Anti-Flag (February 21–March 4, 2009)
 Advent (December 5, 2009)
 Badday Down (March 29, 2009)
 Billy Talent (July 6–30, 2009)
 CF98 (August 17, 2009)
 Donots (July 1, 2010)
 Down by Law (June 29, 2010)
 Fitacola (July 6, 2010)
 Flobots (February 21–March 6, 2009)
 Killswitch Engage (July 30, 2009)
 Landmines (December 4, 2009)
 Lighthouse Project (October 27, 2009)
 Kong Way Down (June 20, 2008)
 Miles Away (March 24, 2009)
 Misconduct (June 16, 2010)
 Noise By Numbers (December 18, 2009)
 Oneword (October 28, 2009)
 Paranoid Visions (February 19, 2009)

 Poison the Well (November 2–4, 2009; November 7–22, 2009)
 Rancid (June 4–July 31, 2009)
 Red Lights Flash (June 5, 2010; June 23–25, 2010)
 Regulations (October 30, 2009)
 Rentokill (February 3–17, 2009; August 21, 2009)
 Rival Schools (August 21, 2009)
 Riverboat Gamblers (June 4–27, 2009)
 Sage Francis (December 1–12, 2008)
 Saint Alvia (July 31, 2009)
 Semmi Komoly (June 21, 2010)
 Sent by Ravens (December 5, 2009)
 Street Sweeper Social Club (December 17, 2009)
 Strike Anywhere (February 3–17, 2009)
 The (International) Noise Conspiracy (March 24–31, 2009)
 The 20 Belows (October 31, 2009)
 The Bollweevils (December 18, 2009)
 The Demise (February 19, 2009)
 The Gaslight Anthem (October 2–November 30, 2008)
 The King Blues (March 5–6, 2009)
 Thrice (October 2–November 30, 2008)
 Thursday (December 1–12, 2008; November 3–4, 2009; November 7–22, 2009)
 Uncommonmenfrommars (June 29, 2010)
 Versus You (June 30, 2010)
 Whitechapel (July 30, 2009)

As a support act
 Green Day (July 1, 2010)

Personnel
Tim McIlrath – lead vocals, rhythm guitar
Joe Principe – bass, backing vocals
Zach Blair – lead guitar, backing vocals
Brandon Barnes – drums, percussion

Songs Played

From The Unraveling
Alive and Well
Stained Glass and Marble
Everchanging

From Revolutions per Minute
Heaven Knows
Dead Ringer
Halfway There
Like the Angel
Blood-Red, White, and Blue
Broken English
Torches

From Siren Song of the Counter Culture
State of the Union
Life Less Frightening
Paper Wings
Blood to Bleed
Give It All
Dancing for Rain
Swing Life Away

From The Sufferer & the Witness
Chamber the Cartridge
Injection
Ready to Fall
Bricks
Under the Knife
Prayer of the Refugee
Drones
Behind Closed Doors
The Good Left Undone
Survive

From Appeal to Reason
Collapse (Post-Amerika)
Long Forgotten Sons
Re-Education (Through Labor)
The Dirt Whispered
From Heads Unworthy
The Strength to Go On
Audience of One
Entertainment
Hero of War
Savior

References

2008 concert tours
2009 concert tours
2010 concert tours
Rise Against concert tours